Geosmin is an irregular sesquiterpenoid, produced from the universal sesquiterpene precursor farnesyl pyrophosphate (also known as farnesyl diphosphate), in a two-step -dependent reaction. Geosmin, along with the irregular monoterpene 2-methylisoborneol, together account for the majority of biologically-caused taste and odor outbreaks in drinking water worldwide. Geosmin has a distinct earthy or musty odor, which most people can easily smell. The geosmin odor detection threshold in humans  is very low, ranging from 0.006 to 0.01 micrograms per liter in water. Geosmin is also responsible for the earthy taste of beetroots and a contributor to the strong scent (petrichor) that occurs in the air when rain falls after a spell of dry weather or when soil is disturbed. 

In chemical terms, geosmin is a bicyclic alcohol with formula , a derivative of decalin. The word was coined in 1965 by the American biochemist Nancy N. Gerber (1929–1985) and the French-American biologist Hubert A. Lechevalier (1926–2015).

Production 
Geosmin is produced by various blue-green algae (cyanobacteria) and filamentous bacteria in the class Actinomyces, and also some other prokaryotes and eukaryotes. The main genera in the cyanobacteria that have been shown to produce geosmin include Anabaena, Phormidium, and Planktothrix, while the main genus in the Actinomyces that produces geosmin is Streptomyces. Communities whose water supplies depend on surface water can periodically experience episodes of unpleasant-tasting water when a sharp drop in the population of these bacteria releases geosmin into the local water supply. Under acidic conditions, geosmin decomposes into odorless substances.

In 2006, geosmin was biosynthesized by a bifunctional Streptomyces coelicolor enzyme. A single enzyme, geosmin synthase, converts farnesyl diphosphate to geosmin in a two-step reaction.

Not all blue-green algae produce geosmin. Identification of species that might produce geosmin is traditionally done through microscopic identification of algae as geosmin producers, a technique that is labor-intensive and requires specialized knowledge. Recent advances in molecular biology have enabled identification of a geosmin synthase gene, geoA, which is present in cyanobacterial species that produce geosmin, but is not present in other cyanobacterial species. Amplification of this gene from water samples using real-time PCR may permit predictions of taste and odor events caused by cyanobacteria in fresh water.

Effects 
The human olfactory system is extremely sensitive to geosmin and is able to detect it at concentrations as low as anywhere from 0.4 parts per billion to 5 parts per trillion.

Geosmin is responsible for the muddy smell in many commercially important freshwater fish such as carp and catfish. Geosmin combines with 2-methylisoborneol, which concentrates in the fatty skin and dark muscle tissues. It breaks down in acid conditions; hence, vinegar and other acidic ingredients are used in fish recipes to reduce the muddy flavor. Taste and odor compounds including geosmin lead to an unpleasant taste of drinking water which is perceived by consumers as an indication of poor water quality. 

This compound is reported to be an issue for saltwater fish farmed in Recirculating aquaculture systems, such as Atlantic salmon, but there are also studies that show that the presence in seawater is significantly lower than that found in freshwater which is why many people consider freshwater fish to taste muddy compared to marine fish.  These systems rely on biological filtration using cultured microbial communities to process the nitrogenous waste from the fish (ammonia) into less harmful compounds (nitrite and nitrate) that can be tolerated at higher concentrations. However, geosmin-producing bacteria can also grow in these systems, and often require fish to be transferred to an additional "finishing" or "purge" system where they are not fed for several days prior to harvest to remove off-flavor compounds and empty the intestinal tract. This process is also known as depuration.

Geosmin remediation in drinking water 
According to municipal water treatment facilities, geosmin cannot be removed from water using standard treatment processes. Treating for geosmin requires additional treatment, which may not be available to all municipal water suppliers. Activated carbon filters may be able to help somewhat, but few studies have been completed to address this issue.

See also 
 Dimethyl sulfide – One of the molecules responsible for the odour of the sea

References

Further reading 

 
 

Tertiary alcohols
Flavors
Soil
Decalins
Foul-smelling chemicals